The Bundesausbildungsförderungsgesetz, mostly known by its abbreviation BAföG or Bafög, is Germany's Federal Training Assistance Act for students who attend secondary schools and universities. Since its introduction in 1971, the BAföG Act has regulated all available federal student grants and loans in Germany. Students who receive financial assistance under this law often refer to it as "receiving BAföG". In 2012, 24% of all students in Germany received financial support from BAföG.

See also 
 Student loan
 Student loans in Germany

References

External links 
 Official BAföG website (German)
 Official BAföG website (English)
 German Federal Ministry for Education and Research: Bundesausbildungsförderungsgesetz - BAföG (German legal text)

Education in Germany
Education finance
Law of Germany